The 1903 Philadelphia mayoral election saw the election John Weaver.

Results

References

1903
Philadelphia
1903 Pennsylvania elections
1900s in Philadelphia